Peter of Capitolias was an 8th-century Christian saint. He was born in Capitolias, in what is today Jordan, married and became the father of three children. After the death of his wife, he became a monk and, according to some traditions, was later consecrated bishop of Bosra. 

He was executed by stoning in Bosra for criticizing Islam. His feast day is January 13 or October 4. Before his execution, he was successively interrogated by the governor of the Jund al-Urdunn district, Umar ibn al-Walid, his deputy Zur'a and finally Caliph al-Walid I.

References

8th-century Christian saints
People executed for blasphemy
715 deaths
Christians from the Umayyad Caliphate
People executed by the Umayyad Caliphate
Christian saints killed by Muslims
Deaths by stoning